Frederick Conway (1900–1973) was an American artist.

Early life and education
Conway was born in Saint Louis, Missouri in 1900. Conway studied at the St. Louis School of Fine Arts, and then moved to Paris to study at the Académie Julian, and at the Academies Moderne and La Grande Chaumiere.

Art career
Conway was part a community of 20th Century St. Louis artists that included Ed Boccia, Fred Green Carpenter, Rudolph Edward Torrini, Herb Cummings, Werner Drewes, Gustav Goetsch, Bill Fett, Phil Sultz, Jan Sultz, and Bob Cassilly.

Conway taught at the art school (now called the Sam Fox School of Design & Visual Arts) of Washington University in St. Louis from 1929 to 1970. Conway was one of the teachers of Billy Morrow Jackson, and was "a close friend and early supporter of German Expressionist painter Max Beckmann". In the 1930s Conway taught at the Ste. Genevieve Art Colony in Ste. Genevieve, Missouri.

Public murals
Conway's mural, The Roundup, a 1940 oil on canvas painting, hangs in the United States Post Office of Purcell, Oklahoma. It was procured by the United States Treasury Section of Painting and Sculpture as part of a 48-state competition to create murals for post offices.

Another Conway mural, The Movement of Time from Redman to Truman (1967), is in the Richard Bolling Federal Building in Kansas City, Missouri. 

His 70-foot long mural Oklahoma Land Run is installed in Tulsa, Oklahoma's First Place Tower. Conway was chosen to create the 1950 mural through a $25,000 USD competition run by the First National Bank.

Collections
Conway's work is included in the collections of the Smithsonian American Art Museum and the Kemper Art Museum.

References

1900 births
1973 deaths
20th-century American artists
Muralists
Artists from St. Louis
Académie Julian alumni
Washington University in St. Louis faculty

External links
Gallery of images of Conway's Tulsa Oklahoma mural Oklahoma Land Run.